The FIFA U-17 World Championship 2001, the ninth edition of the tournament, was held in the cities of Port of Spain, Malabar in Arima, Marabella in San Fernando, Couva, and Bacolet in Scarborough at Trinidad and Tobago between 13 and 30 September 2001. Players born after 1 January 1984 could participate in this tournament. Although France had only appeared once before at the FIFA U-17 World Championship, in Canada back in 1987 when they finished sixth, the current crop of French youngsters arrived in the Caribbean determined to emulate their illustrious elders' winning ways at France '98 and Euro 2000. And so it was, Jean-François Jodar's side showing maturity beyond their years. Aggressive in the tackle and tactically very organised, they oscillated between a 3-5-2 and 3-6-1 and were able to rely on two extremely gifted individuals from Le Havre: Anthony Le Tallec and Florent Sinama Pongolle, who won both the top scorer, with 9 goals scored, and Player of the Tournament awards. The young "Blues" won five of their six games, losing to Nigeria in the first round but getting their revenge in the Final. They hit five in a game on two occasions, against the USA (5–3) and Japan (5–1) in group matches, before brushing past two footballing giants, Brazil and Argentina (2–1 in both games) at the knockout stage and overcoming Nigeria 3–0 in the final to win their first ever FIFA U-17 World title.

Venues

Mascot 
The official mascot of this FIFA U-17 World Championship, Trinidad & Tobago 2001, was BEATS, the humming bird. Its outfit is the same as the home national team, red shirt, black short and red socks. It has Trinidad & Tobago 2001 on the chest.

Squads 
 2001 FIFA U-17 World Championship squads

Qualification 
The following 16 teams qualified for the tournament:

Group stages

Group A

Group B

Group C

Group D

Knockout stages

Quarter-finals

Semi-finals

Third place match

Final

Winners

Awards

Goalscorers 
Florent Sinama Pongolle of France won the Golden Shoe award for scoring nine goals.

Final ranking

External links 
 FIFA U-17 World Championship Trinidad and Tobago 2001, FIFA.com
 FIFA Technical Report (Part 1) and (Part 2)

FIFA U-17 World Championship
FIFA U-17 World Championship
International association football competitions hosted by Trinidad and Tobago
FIFA U-17 World Cup tournaments